John George I may refer to:

 John George I, Prince of Anhalt-Dessau (1567–1618)
 John George I, Elector of Saxony (1585–1656) 
 John George I, Duke of Saxe-Eisenach (1634–1686)